The 2013–14 season will be Swindon Town's second consecutive season in the League One since gaining promotion from League Two in 2012. Swindon will seek to better the 2012–13 season, a campaign that resulted in the Wiltshire club finishing 6th overall and losing in the Play-offs to Brentford at the semi-final stage.

Alongside the league campaign, Swindon Town will also compete in the FA Cup, League Cup and the Johnstone's Paint Trophy. The 2013–14 campaign was scheduled to be Kevin MacDonald's first full season as manager of Swindon Town after replacing Paolo Di Canio in February 2012 but the Scotsman resigned during pre-season.

Chronological list of media reports

Early news

7 April 2013: Kayden Jackson wins the Samsung Win a Pro Contact competition. The one-year deal is scheduled to begin in the Summer of 2013.
 26 April 2013: The BBC report that Tottenham Hotspur youngster Nathan Byrne has agreed a permanent deal with Swindon.
 3 May 2013: Youth graduates Alex Ferguson, Mark Francis, Aaron Oakley, Louis Thompson and Connor Waldon are offered professional contracts.
 9 May 2013: It is confirmed that Simon Ferry, Raffaele De Vita, Joe Devera, Tommy Miller and Chris Smith will not be offered new deals.
 16 May 2013: Budget restraints force Birmingham City end their interest in ex-Town captain Paul Caddis.
 17 May 2013: The club confirm that the club had taken up contract options on Leigh Bedwell, Aden Flint, Miles Storey and Nathan Thompson.
 20 May 2013: It's announced that the club are actively looking for five non-playing employees to take voluntary redundancy.
 20 May 2013: The Swindon Advertiser report that the club have offered Paul Benson to arch-rivals Oxford United.
 21 May 2013: Aden Flint's transfer request is rejected by the club amidst reports of interest from League One rivals Bristol City.
 23 May 2013: The club confirm that search for non-playing staff to take voluntary redundancy had been completed.
 23 May 2013: Tottenham Hotspur youngster Ryan Mason is linked with a move to Swindon Town.
 23 May 2013: Town midfielder Luke Rooney is a transfer target for League Two sides Cheltenham Town and Portsmouth.
 30 May 2013: Plymouth Argyle are reportedly interested in signing Town midfielders Luke Rooney and Lee Cox.
 30 May 2013: The club confirm they are reviewing the contract of ex-Birmingham City loan centre forward Adam Rooney because of its "high value".
 30 May 2013: Brothers Nathan Thompson and Louis Thompson sign two-year contracts with the club.
 31 May 2013: It is reported that a deadline for club captain Alan McCormack to agree to a new deal has passed without a conclusion.
 31 May 2013: Swindon Town celebrate the 20th anniversary of gaining promotion to the top flight for the first time in the club's history.
 3 June 2013: BBC Wiltshire report that Swindon Town captain Alan McCormack has agreed a deal with Brentford.
 3 June 2013: The club confirm that Gary Hooper and Callum Rice have stepped down from their position on the Board with immediate effect.
 6 June 2013: Brentford duo Toumani Diagouraga and Clayton Donaldson plus former Norwich City midfielder Tom Adeyemi are linked to Town.
 6 June 2013: After weeks of negotiations it is reported by BBC Bristol that Swindon have accepted a bid from Bristol City for Aden Flint.
 11 June 2013: Aden Flint completes his move to Bristol City signing a 4-year deal.
 12 June 2013: It is reported that the club have entered negotiations with goalkeeper Wes Foderingham over the possibility of a new two-year deal.
 18 June 2013: Bradford City and Chesterfield are reportedly interested in midfielder Gary Roberts.
 18 June 2013: Veteran defender Darren Ward is subject of strong interest from Brentford.
 18 June 2013: Wales U21 international defender Aaron Oakley signs a one-year professional deal with the club.
 19 June 2013: The Swindon Advertiser report that Crawley Town have entered the race to sign Swindon Town midfielder Luke Rooney.
 20 June 2013: Former Tottenham Hotspur defender Jack Barthram is linked to a move to Swindon.
 21 June 2013: Gary Roberts departs Swindon after he is released from his contract.
 21 June 2013: It is reported that goalkeeper Wes Foderingham has verbally agreed to sign a new contract with the club.
 22 June 2013: Darren Ward enters advanced talks with Brentford over a permanent move to Griffin Park.
 24 June 2013: The first team return for pre-season training with Paul Caddis in attendance despite being linked with a move away from the club.
 25 June 2013: Swindon Town complete the free transfer signings of Alex Smith and Jack Barthram.
 25 June 2013: Wes Foderingham extends his contract with the club until the summer of 2015.
 27 June 2013: Watford midfielder John Eustace is linked to club by the Swindon Advertiser.
 27 June 2013: Swindon Town announce the departure of Paul Bodin as Under 18's manager effective immediately.

Pre-season news
1 July 2013: Stevenage captain Mark Roberts rejects a move to the club.
 1 July 2013: Spurs duo Massimo Luongo and Grant Hall are confirmed to be training with the club while Daniel Devine arrives on trial.
 2 July 2013: Another Tottenham Hotspur youngster, Alex Pritchard, is linked with a move to SN1.
 2 July 2013: Spurs duo Massimo Luongo and Grant Hall join on season-long loan deals while Tijane signs a two-year contract.
 4 July 2013: The fixture at MK Dons will be televised by SkySports in September.
 4 July 2013: The Robins are handed a bye in the first round stage of the Johnstone's Paint Trophy.
 8 July 2013: Reports indicate that Nathan Byrne is close to a permanent move to Swindon.
 9 July 2013: Nathan Byrne joins for an undisclosed fee while former Spurs teammate Alex Pritchard signs a season-long loan deal.
 9 July 2013: Lee Power and Sangita Shah are confirmed as new members of the Board.
 13 July 2013: Contract-exile Adam Rooney is training with Oldham Athletic.
 13 July 2013: Kevin MacDonald resigns as manager of the club.
 16 July 2013: Les Ferdinand is linked to the vacant managerial role. Martin Ling and Robbie Fowler also declare their interest.
 16 July 2013: Tottenham Hotspur centre forward Jonathan Obika is reported to be a transfer target for the Wiltshire club.
 17 July 2013: Glenn Hoddle and Alloa Athletic boss Paul Hartley are the latest names to be linked with the Swindon managerial post.
 17 July 2013: It is announced that former Floriana midfielder Harry Agombar has signed a permanent contract with the club.
 17 July 2013: National reports suggest the former captain Paul Caddis is close to a move to Championship side Blackpool.
 18 July 2013: Paul Caddis fails to agree terms with Blackpool while Neil Warnock and Paul Tisdale distance themselves from the Town job.
 19 July 2013: Tottenham Hotspur youngster Ryan Mason is once again rumoured as a transfer target.
 19 July 2013: Darren Ward has been offered a contract extension in a bid to keep the veteran defender at the club.
 20 July 2013: Peter Schmeichel and John Jensen have been reportedly presented to Swindon Town as the club's potential new management team.
 21 July 2013: SkySports link former Kilmarnock manager Kenny Shiels to the managerial position.
 21 July 2013: It is reported that Swindon have accepted a bid from Hibs for centre forward James Collins.
 22 July 2013: Wales international Simon Church is reportedly offered a permanent contract with the club.
24 July 2013: It is announced that the club's ongoing contract dispute with former manager Paolo Di Canio has been settled out of court.

25 July 2013: It was reported former Town defender Alberto Comazzi was set to take legal action against the club for unpaid costs.

25 July 2013: Former Malmö FF coach Bob Houghton is the latest name to emerge as a reported applicant for the Town manager job.
26 July 2013: Ryan Harley joins the club from Brighton & Hove Albion, signing on a two-year deal.

26 July 2013: Former Exeter City and Charlton Athletic defender Matt Taylor is linked with a move to Wiltshire.

1 August 2013: Adam Rooney signs for Oldham Athletic thus potentially ending a contract dispute with Swindon.

2 August 2013: Darren Ward is confirmed as the Swindon Town's new Club Captain.

Season news (2013)
7 August 2013: It is reported that Swindon are interested in signing Bournemouth's Wes Thomas and former Town forward Leon Clarke.

8 August 2013: Former Swindon Town defender Steve Aizlewood dies, aged 60, after a short illness.

9 August 2013: Bournemouth reject a second bid from Swindon for Wes Thomas.

9 August 2013: Exiled-Town forward Paul Benson is linked to a season-long loan move to Non-League side Luton Town.

12 August 2013: Captain Darren Ward is reportedly as set to sign a new contract. Millwall player Dany N'Guessan is also linked with a move.

13 August 2013: Ex-Newcastle United forward Nile Ranger has reportedly held talks with Swindon over the possibility of joining the club.
16 August 2013: Chairman Jed McCrory releases a statement justifying the decision to sign Nile Ranger despite the players ongoing legal issues.

19 August 2013: Paul Caddis is linked with a move to Millwall.

19 August 2013: Town captain Darren Ward signs a contract extension with club expiring in 2015.

20 August 2013: Mark Cooper is appointed manager of Swindon Town, signing a two-year contract.

22 August 2013: Luton Town managing director Gary Sweet tells the local press that a deal for Town forward Paul Benson is imminent.

22 August 2013: Mark Cooper confirms that Yeovil Town are interested in taking Andy Williams back to Huish Park.

23 August 2013: It is reported that ex-Motherwell midfielder Tom Hateley is training with the club.

27 August 2013: Former Town captain Paul Caddis publicly vents his frustration over his prolonged Town exit through a BBC radio interview.

27 August 2013: Peterborough United forward Emile Sinclair is linked but a move is reported as unlikely to take place.

29 August 2013: It is announced that Swindon Town's plum League Cup tie against Chelsea on 24 September will be televised live on SkySports.
2 September 2013: Yaser Kasim is subject of a reported £250,000 'Deadline Day' bid from a Championship level side.

9 September 2013: The club appeal against the dismissal of Nathan Byrne by referee Stuart Attwell during the 1–1 draw at Milton Keynes Dons.
13 September 2013: Miles Storey signs a contract extension with the club which is now scheduled to end in 2015.

19 September 2013: Over-subscription at the National Football Centre delays the treatment of Tijane Reis' knee injury.

26 September 2013: Yaser Kasim is called up by the Iraq senior squad for their international fixture against Saudi Arabia on 15 October 2013.
3 October 2013: Yaser Kasim signs a contract extension with the club, keeping the Iraqi at the County Ground until 2016.

11 October 2013: First Team Coach Luke Williams plays down news that Gus Poyet plans to add the Swindon coach to his Sunderland backroom staff.
6 November 2013: Andy Williams' season-long loan at Yeovil Town is cut-short after a serious knee injury ends his season.

7 November 2013: Steve Murrall leaves his role as Swindon Town's general manager.

15 November 2013: The club confirm that Nile Ranger has given a leave of absence as the forward prepares for his forthcoming court appearance.

22 November 2013: Reports emerge that Town goalkeeper Wes Foderingham could leave the club in the January transfer window.
23 November 2013: A man is arrested as Wiltshire Police investigate an attack on Leyton Orient goalkeeper Jamie Jones during Swindon's loss to Orient at the County Ground.

29 November 2013: Rumours of a boardroom dispute emerge when an official statement suggesting that Lee Power has taken ownership of the club from Jed McCrory is later withdrawn.
3 December 2013: Steve Murrall, the club's former general manager, tells the Swindon Advertiser that he did not resign from his position on the club's board.
3 December 2013: Jed McCrory resigns as chairman. He also steps down from his position on the board.

3 December 2013: Lee Power is confirmed as the new owner of Swindon Town Football Club.

4 December 2013: New Swindon Town owner, Lee Power, moves to allay financial fears surrounding the club.

12 December 2013: Swindon Town release the findings of a recent audit announcing that operating losses have fallen from £3.6m per annum to £1.2m.

19 December 2013: Steve Anderson is confirmed as the club's new general manager.
19 December 2013: Kidderminster Harriers defender, Cheyenne Dunkley, is linked with a move to Swindon Town.
27 December 2013: Town manager Mark Cooper admits that the club may look to offload Nile Ranger within the January transfer window after the forward failed to turn up for training.

Season news (2014)

1 January 2014: Swindon Town P–P Crawley Town (postponed due to a waterlogged pitch).
2 January 2014: Swindon Town's latest bid for AFC Bournemouth forward Wes Thomas is rejected.
8 January 2014: Chairman Lee Power opens talks with Liverpool centre-forward Michael Ngoo over a proposed loan transfer.
11 January 2014: The club announces that Nile Ranger had issued an apology to his teammates regarding his truant behaviour thus saving him from the sack.

13 January 2014: Lee Power bans the Swindon Advertiser from the club after reporter Sam Morshead made comments on Twitter regarding Nile Ranger's return to the squad.
24 January 2014: It is reported that Dany N'Guessan has been made available for loan by the club.
26 February 2014: Massimo Luongo is called up by the Australia senior side.
27 February 2014: Yaser Kasim is called up by the Iraq senior side.
4 March 2014: Swindon Town centre forward Nile Ranger is cleared of rape by a jury following a week-long trial at Newcastle Crown Court, Newcastle-upon-Tyne.

5 March 2014: Yaser Kasim makes his international debut for Iraq in the 3–1 AFC Asian Cup qualifier victory over China.
5 March 2014: Massimo Luongo makes his international debut for Australia in the 3–4 friendly loss to Ecuador.

10 March 2014: It is announced that Alex Pritchard is on the shortlist for Football League's Young Player of the Year award.
12 March 2014: The Football League shortlist Alex Pritchard for the annual League One Player of the Year award.

18 April 2014: An ownership disputes emerges when former holding company Seebeck 87 Ltd attempt to place three new director on the club board claiming that they were still owners of Swindon Town Football Club. The current holding company Swinton Reds 20 Ltd unsuccessfully attempt to obtain an injunction and Seebeck get the three individuals on the board with 'advisory' roles.

27 April 2014: The club release a statement reiterating that Swindon Town F.C. deplore acts of violence after newspaper reports publish a video involving Nile Ranger.

28 April 2014: Nile Ranger is held for questioning regarding the alleged assault on a woman and criminal damage in Swindon.

30 April 2014: Swinton Reds 20 Ltd and Seebeck 87 Ltd are locked in deliberations for two hours at the Rolls Building (Court rooms) before the ongoing ownership dispute was adjourned by Mr Justice Warren.
2 May 2014: Nile Ranger is released by the club.

Tottenham Hotspur link up
Throughout 2013, Swindon Town seemingly built a close working relationship with Premier League side Tottenham Hotspur. Massimo Luongo, Nathan Byrne and Dean Parrett joined on loan deals during the closing stages of the 2012–13 season and the partnership grew during the 2013 close season. This included Spurs loaning and transferring players to Swindon, friendly fixtures being arranged between the two clubs and members of the Tottenham coaching staff being linked to the managerial position after Kevin MacDonald's exit from Swindon Town.

In December 2013, owner Lee Power announced that there was no special relationship Spurs.

Spurs connections linked to playing/coaching roles

The 2013 manager search

On 13 July 2013 manager Kevin MacDonald resigned from his post as manager citing "personal reasons". This sparked a flurry of media interest as the Wiltshire club began their search for a new manager. A recent but significant link with Spurs results in several of their coaches being linked with the vacancy (Tim Sherwood, Les Ferdinand and Chris Ramsey) while the Swindon Advertiser reported that former player Martin Ling was interested in the role. The local media order linked Danish duo Peter Schmeichel and John Jensen along with Exeter City manager Paul Tisdale. The national media linked Kenny Shiels while Paul Hartley, Neil Warnock, Glenn Hoddle, Paul Trollope and Stuart Pearce were rated among the favourites on Bookmaker listings. After five and a half weeks without making an appointment, caretaker manager Mark Cooper is given the role on a permanent basis, signing a two-year contract.

Coaches linked

League One data

Result summary

Sponsors

Pre-season 

Between 2006 and 2012, Swindon Town spent time during their pre-season schedule abroad in the Balearic Islands, Austria and Italy. The 2013/14 schedule started in England with friendlies arranged with Swindon Supermarine (away), Banbury United (away), Forest Green Rovers (away) which were followed by home ties against Tottenham Hotspur and Birmingham City. An away trip against Cirencester Town completed the scheduled along with Development XI friendlies at Devizes Town and Fairford Town. It was later announced that Swindon would spend a week in Portugal from 21 July. Two friendlies would also be arranged.

Pre-season began with a comfortable 3–1 victory at Swindon Supermarine. However, this was followed by a poor 2–0 defeat at Banbury United where Kevin MacDonald criticised the standard of the Oxfordshire outfit's pitch. Swindon Town got back to winning ways as a Development side beat Devizes Town 5–0 at Nursteed Road. Days later, Town faced Non-League side Forest Green Rovers who easily beat Swindon 2–0. Reports begin to circulate that manager Kevin MacDonald is set to resign from his post and this is confirmed 24 hours later citing "personal reasons" for his exit and assistant Mark Cooper is named Caretaker manager.

Pre-Season results and line-ups

League One 

The fixture list for the 2013/14 campaign was announced on 19 June 2013. It was announced that the Wiltshire outfits first game of the season would take place against Darren Ferguson's Peterborough United at London Road on 3 August 2013.

August

September

October

November

December

January

February

March

April

May

The F.A. Cup

F.A. Cup results

The League Cup 

On 12 June 2013 it was confirmed that Swindon Town had been seeded for the first round of the competition. It was later announced that Swindon would face Football League Two outfit Torquay United in the opening round of the competition.

League Cup results

The Football League Trophy

Football League Trophy results

Club information

Non-playing staff

In December 2013, Swindon Town changed ownership with Lee Power replacing Jed McCrory.

Jed McCrory Era (up until 3 December 2013)

Lee Power Era (from 3 December 2013)

Squad statistics

Appearances and goals

|-
|colspan="14"|Players who are contracted to Swindon Town but are currently out on loan:

|-
|colspan="14"|Players who were contracted to Swindon Town but have since departed on a permanent basis:

|-
|}

Managerial season stats

Captains

Goalscorers

Hat-tricks

Includes all competitive matches.
{| class="wikitable" style="font-size: 95%; text-align: center;"
|-
!width=15|
!width=15|
!width=15|
!width=15|
!width=150|Name
!width=150|Competition
!width=200|Opposition
!width=200|Goals
!width=100|Final Score
|-
|1
|8
|MF
|
|Ryan Mason
|League One
|vs. Crewe Alexandra
|  
|Won 5–0
|-

Penalties

Includes all competitive matches.

{| class="wikitable" style="font-size: 95%; text-align: center;"
|-
!width=15|
!width=15|
!width=15|
!width=15|
!width=150|Name
!width=150|Competition
!width=200|Opposition
!width=50|Success
!width=100|Final Score
|-
|1
|11
|MF
|
|Alex Pritchard
|The League Cup
|vs. Torquay United
|
| 1–0 WIN
|-
|2
|8
|MF
|
|Ryan Mason
|League One
|vs. Crewe Alexandra
|
| 5–0 WIN
|-
|3
|8
|MF
|
|Ryan Mason
|League One
|vs. Crewe Alexandra
|
| 5–0 WIN
|-
|4
|12
|FW
|
|Dany N'Guessan
|League One
|vs. Tranmere Rovers
|
| 1–0 WIN
|-
|5
|12
|FW
|
|Dany N'Guessan
|League One
|vs. Notts County
|
| 2–0 WIN
|-
|6
|11
|MF
|
|Alex Pritchard
|Football League Trophy
|vs. Stevenage
|
| 3–1 on pens.
|-
|7
|34
|FW
|
|Mohamed El-Gabbas
|Football League Trophy
|vs. Stevenage
|
| 3–1 on pens.
|-
|8
|15
|MF
|
|Yaser Kasim
|Football League Trophy
|vs. Stevenage
|
| 3–1 on pens.
|-
|9
|4
|MF
|
|Massimo Luongo
|Football League Trophy
|vs. Peterborough United
|
| 3–4 on pens.
|-
|10
|15
|MF
|
|Yaser Kasim
|Football League Trophy
|vs. Peterborough United
|
| 3–4 on pens.
|-
|11
|11
|MF
|
|Alex Pritchard
|Football League Trophy
|vs. Peterborough United
|
| 3–4 on pens.
|-
|12
|41
|DF
|
|Troy Archibald-Henville
|Football League Trophy
|vs. Peterborough United
|
| 3–4 on pens.
|-
|13
|6
|MF
|
|Tijane Reis
|Football League Trophy
|vs. Peterborough United
|
| 3–4 on pens.
|-
|14
|28
|FW
|
|Michael Smith
|League One
|vs. Preston North End
|
| 1–0 WIN.
|-
|15
|28
|FW
|
|Michael Smith
|League One
|vs. Brentford
|
| 1–0 WIN.
|-
|16
|28
|FW
|
|Michael Smith
|League One
|vs. Rotherham United
|
| 1–2 Loss.
|-

Clean sheets

Includes all competitive matches.

{| class="wikitable" style="font-size: 95%; text-align: center;"
|-
!width=15|
!width=15|
!width=15|
!width=15|
!width=150|Name
!width=80|League One
!width=80|FA Cup
!width=80|League Cup
!width=80|JP Trophy
!width=80|Total
|-
|1
|1
|GK
|
| Wes Foderingham
|11
|0
|2
|0
|13
|-
|2
|25
|GK
|
| Tyrell Belford
|1
|0
|0
|0
|1
|-
|colspan="4"|
|TOTALS
|12
|0
|2
|0
|14

Disciplinary

Suspensions

Awards

Transfers

Trial players

Overall summary

Score overview

Swindon Town Development
In June 2011 it was announced that Swindon Town would not compete in a Reserve League for the 2011/12 season and would therefore arrange friendlies with other clubs and this continued during the 2012/13 and 2013/14 campaigns.

Development results

Swindon Town U18

The Swindon Town U18 side compete in the Youth Alliance (South West Conference) alongside local rivals Oxford United and Bristol Rovers.

U18 squad

Youth coaching staff

 Under 18's Manager: Jamie Pitman
 Centre of Excellence: Jeremy Newton
 Phase Development Coach: Sean Wood
 Academy Goalkeeping Coach: Steve Hale

Youth results

References 

Swindon Town F.C. seasons
Swindon Town F.C.